Misato Koide (born 23 September 1978) is a Japanese archer. She competed in the women's individual and team events at the 1996 Summer Olympics.

References

1978 births
Living people
Japanese female archers
Olympic archers of Japan
Archers at the 1996 Summer Olympics
Place of birth missing (living people)
20th-century Japanese women